Board Up the House Remixes Volume 2 is the second of five in the Board Up the House Remix Series by Genghis Tron. It was released by Lovepump United on October 14, 2008. However, those ordered directly from the label were shipped out approximately one month before that.

The first 1000 copies are on yellow with red splatter vinyl. There is no CD version.

Track listing

References

2008 EPs
Genghis Tron albums